A hydrofunctionalization reaction is the addition of hydrogen and another univalent fragment (X) across a carbon-carbon or carbon-heteroatom multiple bond.  Often, the term hydrofunctionalization without modifier refers specifically to the use of the covalent hydride (H-X) as the source of hydrogen and X for this transformation.  If other reagents are used to achieve the net addition of hydrogen and X across a multiple bond, the process may be referred to as a formal hydrofunctionalization.

For terminal olefins (or acetylenes), the regioselectivity of the process can be described as Markovnikov (addition of X at the substituted end) or anti-Markovnikov (addition of X at the unsubstituted end).  Catalysts are frequently employed to control the chemo-, regio-, and stereoselectivity of hydrofunctionalization reactions.

Examples 

Some of the better known classes of hydrofunctionalization reactions include the following:

Hydroboration
Hydrosilylation
Hydrometalation (including both transition or main group metal hydrides)
Hydroamination
(Olefin) hydration (addition of H2O across a double bond)
Hydroalkoxylation (also known as hydroetherification)
Hydrohalogenation
Hydrovinylation (including hydroarylation and olefin dimerization and others)
Hydroacylation
Hydroformylation (refers specifically to the addition of CHO and H using H2 and CO as reagents, also known as the oxo process)

References 

Addition reactions